The Elkay Apartments is a historic five-unit two-story multi-family building located at 638-642 Kelton Avenue, in the Westwood neighborhood of Los Angeles, California.

History 
Designed in 1948 in the International Style of architecture by Los Angeles architect Richard Neutra, it was completed in 1948 for violist Louis Kievman. The name Elkay is derived from his initials.

The building is a part of a collection of homes designed by Neutra and built in North West Westwood Village, including the Landfair Apartments and Strathmore Apartments. It is next door to the Kelton Apartments, which Neutra designed in 1941 for himself. The Elkay Apartments is the last home designed by Neutra in North Westwood Village. On June 21, 1988, despite objections from the owners of the Apartments at the time, the City of Los Angeles designated the building as a Los Angeles Historic-Cultural Monument.

References

Los Angeles Historic-Cultural Monuments
International style architecture in California
Modernist architecture in California
Apartment buildings in Los Angeles
Richard Neutra buildings
Residential buildings completed in 1948
Westwood, Los Angeles
1948 establishments in California